The Ministry of Social Development and Human Security (Abrv: MSDHS;), is a Thai governmental body responsible for ensuring the welfare of the Thai people. , the minister responsible is Juti Krairiksh.

Background
The Ministry of Social Development and Human Security (MSDHS) is a Thai government ministry created by the Restructuring of Government Agencies Act of 2002 in 2003 during the administration of Prime Minister Thaksin Shinawatra.

Budget
The MSDHS fiscal year 2019 budget is 13,342 million baht, down from 13,718 million baht in FY2018.

Organization

Administration 
 Office of the Minister
 Office of the Permanent Secretary

Dependent departments 
 Department of Social Development and Welfare
 Department of Children and Youth
 Department of Older Persons
 Department of Women's Affairs and Family Development
 Department of Empowerment of Persons With Disabilities
 Youth Housing Council

State enterprises 
 National Housing Authority
 Office of the Government Pawnshop

Public Organization 
 Community Organizations Development Institute

See also
 List of government ministries of Thailand

References

Social Development and Human Security
Social affairs ministries
Society of Thailand